This list of insect documentaries includes both educational and scientific films about insects, as well as notable documentary television programs about insects. It excludes fictional accounts of insects, such as those in the science fiction eco-horror subgenre.

Films
 1910 The Acrobatic Fly by F. Percy Smith
 1911 The Strength and Agility of Insects by F. Percy Smith
 1911  by Roberto Omegna and Guido Gozzano
 1960 Secrets of the Ant and Insect World from Walt Disney's 1956 Secrets of Life
 1996 Microcosmos by Claude Nuridsany and Marie Pérennou is a record of detailed interactions between insects and other small invertebrates.
 2009 Beetle Queen Conquers Tokyo by Jessica Oreck
 2009 Vanishing of the Bees by George Langworthy and Maryam Henein about bees' colony collapse disorder 
 2010 The Death of an Insect by Hannes Vartiainen and Pekka Veikkolainen
 2010 Colony by Carter Gunn and Ross McDonnell about bees' colony collapse disorder
 2010 Queen of the Sun by Taggart Siegel about bees' colony collapse disorder
 2012 More than Honey by Markus Imhoof about honeybees
 2016 Bugs by Andreas Johnsen about insects as a food source for humans

The Hellstrom Chronicle (1971) is a quasi-documentary film about the struggle between man and insects. Andrea Shaw called it a faux documentary, although it won the 1971 Academy Award for the best documentary.

Television and video
 1973 and forward The Real world of insects series by the Learning Corporation of America
 1979 David Attenborough's BBC series Life on Earth, episodes "The First Forests" and "The Swarming Hordes"
 1999, 2001 Insectia a Discovery Channel program
 2003 Episodes of DragonflyTV including "Creepy Crawlies" (2003), Weevils (2006) and "Butterfly Wings" (2008)
 2005 David Attenborough's BBC series Life in the Undergrowth 
 2009, 2011-2012 Monster Bug Wars by Beyond Television Productions of Australia

See also
 List of documentary films
 Nature documentary
 List of films featuring anthropomorphic insects
 List of natural horror films#Insects

References

 Documentaries
Documentaries about science
Lists of documentaries